Edgar Gevorgyan (born May 21, 1982 in Vanadzor, Armenian SSR) is an Armenian weightlifter. He competed at the 2008 Summer Olympics in the men's 85 kg division. Gevorgyan competed along with his compatriot Tigran Vardan Martirosyan, who eventually won the bronze medal. Gevorgyan successfully lifted 176 kg in the single-motion snatch, but did not finish the event, as he failed to hoist 196 kg in three attempts for the two-part, shoulder-to-overhead clean and jerk.

References

External links
NBC 2008 Olympics profile
Sports-Reference.com

1982 births
Living people
People from Vanadzor
Armenian male weightlifters
Olympic weightlifters of Armenia
Weightlifters at the 2008 Summer Olympics